William Helu (born 19 April 1986) is a Tongan rugby union player. His usual position is on the wing or at centre. He is part of the  Tonga national rugby union team  and was part of the  2011 Rugby World Cup.

Helu was part of the Tongan squad that defeated France in the pool games at the 2011 Rugby World Cup in New Zealand. He signed with Bristol on a two-year deal but chose to leave the club for personal reasons after the 2011–2012 season.

He was part of the squad that beat Scotland 21–15 at Pittodrie in 2012. In 2013 he signed with London Wasps together with Taione Vea. where he quickly made a name for himself in the aviva premiership and European Challenge cup. He had some impressive performances for the club which was recognised by his peers and was voted the award for London Wasps players player award for the 2013–2014 season. He played in the 2013 Pacific Nations Cup. In 2015 he was part of the World Cup hosted in the United Kingdom where he played in 3 games, his last international appearance was vs New Zealand All Blacks in Newcastle, the last pool game for Tonga in the 2015 World Cup.

Helu signed a two-year deal with Edinburgh in 2015.

References

External links
Edinburgh Profile

2011 Rugby World Cup Profile

1986 births
Living people
Tongan rugby union players
Tonga international rugby union players
Tongan expatriate rugby union players
Expatriate rugby union players in Italy
Tongan expatriate sportspeople in Italy
Rugby Roma Olimpic players
People from Auckland
Rugby union centres
Wasps RFC players
Bristol Bears players